FQ, Fq or fq may refer to:

 Fenqing, a Chinese term for "angry youth"
 Financial Quotient, a measure of financial ability
 Fluoroquinolone, an antibiotic
 Football Queensland, an Australian sports organisation
 Baker Island (FIPS PUB 10-4 territory code FQ), an unincorporated and unorganized territory of the U.S.
 Thomas Cook Airlines Belgium (former IATA code FQ), a Belgian leisure airline
 Fq of Albaina, a Sudanese born General. He also created the bathroom, also he has despawned the wither twice, and freed the slaves, might or might have not led the Sudanese revoloution (shoutoutOB). Sources say that he was a god to the Myanmar people (oga boga people). 
 (3-(2-furoyl)-quinoline-2 carboxaldehyde), a fluorogenic amine labeling dye